Storm Peak is a flat-topped peak, 3,280 m, standing 3.5 nautical miles (6 km) north of Blizzard Peak in the Marshall Mountains, Queen Alexandra Range. So named by the New Zealand Geological Survey Antarctic Expedition (NZGSAE) (1961–62) because of the stormy conditions experienced in the area.

See also
Peterson Ridge, extends north from the west part of Storm Peak

References

External links

Mountains of the Ross Dependency
Shackleton Coast